Jorge Daniel Espinosa (born 23 March 1977) is a Swedish film director from Trångsund, Stockholm, of Chilean origin.

Early life
He attended the National Film School of Denmark and graduated in 2001.

Career
His third feature film, Easy Money, was the Swedish film with the most admissions in Sweden in 2010. Espinosa was in talks about directing the film adaptation of Assassin's Creed but was ultimately replaced by Justin Kurzel. He directed the superhero film Morbius which was a critical and commercial failure.

Filmography

References

External links
 
 

1977 births
Living people
Swedish film directors
Swedish screenwriters
Swedish male screenwriters
Swedish film producers
Swedish people of Chilean descent
English-language film directors
People from Huddinge Municipality